Rudoltice is a municipality and village in the Ústí nad Orlicí District in the Pardubice Region of the Czech Republic. It has about 1,900 inhabitants.

Geography
It is located in the Podorlická Uplands near the Bohemian-Moravian border within the historical land of Bohemia.

The local stream Rudoltička flows through the municipality. A set of three fish ponds lies in the municipality on a tributary of Rudoltička. Small part of the Lanškroun Ponds Nature Park lies in the northern part of the municipal territory.

History

Rudoltice was probably founded between 1250 and 1270, during the colonization of Bohemia initiated by the Ottokar II. The first written mention is from 21 May 1304 under the name Rudolfsdorf when King Wenceslaus II donated it to the Zbraslav Monastery. Rudoltice belonged to Lanšperk-Lanškroun estate during the entire Middle Ages.

The first known owners of Rudoltice were lords of Drnholec. Since 1349, Rudoltice was a parish village. After the Battle of White Mountain in 1622, it was acquired by the Liechtenstein family.

Sights

The main landmark is the Church of Saints Peter and Paul. It was built in late Baroque style in 1804–1809 and replaced an old wooden church. The adjacent rectory is from 1770–1794.

A notable building is also the New Castle. The three-storey rectangular building is a torso of a larger castle, which was built for Hans-Adam I of Liechtenstein in 1700–1712.

References

External links

 

Villages in Ústí nad Orlicí District